David Slade is the Australian Director of British multinational retailer Topshop and co-owner of A-League club Western Sydney Wanderers.

References

Living people
Australian soccer chairmen and investors
A-League Men executives
Year of birth missing (living people)